St Columba's Chapel (Kilcomkill) is a ruined medieval chapel near Southend, Argyll and Bute, Scotland. It is noted for its carved grave slabs.

References

Churches in Argyll and Bute
Ruins in Argyll and Bute
Church ruins in Scotland
Scheduled Ancient Monuments in Argyll and Bute